Euclid is a city in Cuyahoga County, Ohio,  United States. It is an inner ring suburb of Cleveland. The population was 49,692 at the 2020 census, making it the fourth largest city in Cuyahoga County, behind Cleveland, Parma and Lakewood.

History
The City of Euclid was originally a part of Euclid Township, first mapped in 1796 and named for Euclid of Alexandria, the ancient Greek mathematician.  The first sparse settlement in the township began in 1798, with major settlement beginning in the spring of 1804. The first settlers in what is now the City of Euclid were Joseph Burke, David Dille and William Coleman, and their families. Following the Civil War the lake plain of Euclid Township was known for numerous excellent vineyards. Euclid Village incorporated out of the northeast portion of the township in 1903. It developed as an industrial center in the early 20th century, and became a city in 1930.

Geography
Euclid is located at  (41.595563, -81.519176).

It is on the shore of Lake Erie, with a beachfront area along its north edge.

Bordering Euclid are Cleveland on the west, South Euclid and Richmond Heights on the south, Willowick, Wickliffe, and Willoughby Hills on the east, and Lake Erie on the north.

It is part of the Lake Erie Snowbelt region, prone to snow squalls blowing off Lake Erie, particularly before the lake freezes over in winter.

City facts

The Charter is Mayor and Council with  eight councilors and one council president.

Its assessed valuation is $825,325,160. There are 150 companies in the city.

Transportation
The city contains  of streets;  of Interstate 90,  of south spur,  of sewers,  of water mains, three railroads; the CSX and Norfolk Southern Railway and one bus line; Greater Cleveland Regional Transit Authority. Amtrak operates its Lake Shore Limited service between Chicago, Cleveland, New York and Boston twice daily, but does not stop in Euclid.

Demographics

2020 census

Note: the US Census treats Hispanic/Latino as an ethnic category. This table excludes Latinos from the racial categories and assigns them to a separate category. Hispanics/Latinos can be of any race.

2010 census
As of the census of 2010, there were 48,920 people, 22,685 households, and 12,187 families living in the city. The racial makeup of the city was 43.8% White, 52.6% African American, 0.2% Native American, 0.7% Asian, 0.3% from other races, and 2.3% from two or more races. Hispanic or Latino of any race were 1.6% of the population.

There were 22,685 households, of which 27.8% had children under the age of 18 living with them, 28.4% were married couples living together, 20.9% had a female householder with no husband present, 4.4% had a male householder with no wife present, and 46.3% were non-families. 41.4% of all households were made up of individuals, and 14.5% had someone living alone who was 65 years of age or older. The average household size was 2.13 and the average family size was 2.91.

The median age in the city was 61 years. 22.9% of residents were under the age of 18; 7.8% were between the ages of 18 and 24; 24.3% were from 25 to 44; 28.9% were from 45 to 64; and 15.9% were 65 years of age or older. The gender makeup of the city was 44.8% male and 55.2% female.

2000 census
As of the census of 2000, there were 52,717 people, 24,353 households, the 13,491 families living in the city. The population density was 4,923.2 people per square mile (1,900.5/km). There were 26,123 housing units at an average density of 2,439.6 per square mile (941.8/km). The racial makeup of the city was 66.36% White, 30.57% African American, 0.12% Native American, 0.94% Asian, 0.02% Pacific Islander, 0.35% from other races, and 1.64% from two or more races. Hispanic or Latino of any race were 1.15% of the population.

There were 24,353 households, out of which 24.9% had children under the age of 18 living with them, 36.3% were married couples living together, 15.2% had a female householder with no husband present, and 44.6% were non-families. 39.7% of all households were made up of individuals, and 16.1% had someone living alone who was 65 years of age or older. The average household size was 2.14 and the average family size was 2.89.

In the city, the population was spread out, with 22.3% under the age of 18, 6.8% from 18 to 24, 30.7% from 25 to 44, 21.0% from 45 to 64, and 19.2% who were 65 years of age or older. The median age was 39 years. For every 100 females, there were 84.0 males. For every 100 females age 18 and over, there were 79.1 males.

The median income for a household in the city was $35,151, and the median income for a family was $45,278. Males had a median income of $35,914 versus $28,528 for females. The per capita income for the city was $19,664. About 7.1% of families and 9.7% of the population were below the poverty line, including 11.9% of those under age 18 and 11.2% of those age 65 or over.

91.8% spoke English, 1.8% Spanish, 1.3% Croatian, 1.2% Slovene, and 0.62% Italian as their first language.

Notable attractions/history

 Euclid is the site of the 1926 U.S. Supreme Court case Euclid v. Ambler. The case opened the doors for municipalities across the United States to establish zoning ordinances.    
 Euclid is home to the National Cleveland-Style Polka Hall of Fame tracing Cleveland-Style Polka from its Slovenian roots.
 Euclid is the home of Euclid High School, one of five schools in Ohio to split its school up via the Knowledgeworks Foundation grant. However, the program ended in 2009 due to low test score improvement and rising costs.
 Euclid is home to the Euclid Pony Baseball League, founded in 1951.
 Euclid is the city where Charles F. Brush created the Arc Lamp in 1876
 Euclid is the home to both the main plant and corporate headquarters of the Lincoln Electric Company, Located on St. Clair Avenue.
 Euclid is home to the annual CABA High School World Series baseball tournament.  Past notable tournament players include Alex Rodriguez and Jeffrey Hammonds.
 Euclid is home of the Greater Cleveland Slo-Pitch Softball Hall of Fame.
 Euclid Beach Park was originally part of Euclid Township, until the boundaries were redrawn in the early 1900s.  
 Walk Two Moons by Sharon Creech was partly set in Euclid. 
 Euclid was home to two government owned housing projects, East 200th Street and Briardale. Both were torn down due to the federal government's failure to maintain the properties. Briardale now serves as the Municipal Golf Course, called Briardale Greens.
 Euclid was the home town of new wave science fiction author Roger Zelazny.
 The cordless telephone was invented in Euclid by George Sweigert in 1969.
 Euclid houses the Euclid Public Library, ranked third in the nation in the 50,000 population category in 2007, and has been recognized in the Top Ten of the HAPLER Public library Ratings.
 The 1987 movie Light of Day was partially filmed in Euclid. The opening scene pans the area from a helicopter.  
 Euclid was the home to northern Ohio's first commercial UHF television station in 1968, WKBF Channel 61, then a Kaiser owned station located on St.Clair Avenue.
 Euclid was the original location to the corporate headquarters of Reliance Electric, Thompson Products (TRW), and Addressograph-Multigraph.
 In June 2011, Lincoln Electric installed a 2.5 Megawatt wind turbine.  At 443 feet, it is the largest in Ohio and one of the largest in North America.
 Home to the Euclid Road Machinery Company, a branch of Euclid Crane and Hoist Company. Founded by George A. Armington and his five sons. Taken over by General Motors, before the United States determined it to be a monopoly. In its time, it was one of the most valuable companies in Euclid and the name was known worldwide, among the earth moving and heavy equipment community.
 Euclid is partly home to Euclid Creek Reservation, a property of Cleveland Metroparks which shares space in South Euclid, Cleveland and Richmond Heights.

Transportation
 Euclid is situated near the junction of Interstate 90, Interstate 271 and Ohio Route 2, giving easy access by car to downtown Cleveland, Lake County, and most of Cleveland’s east suburbs.
 Major east-west thoroughfares include Lake Shore Blvd. (SR 283), Lakeland Freeway (I-90/SR2), St. Clair Avenue, Euclid Avenue (US 20), and Chardon Road (US 6). North–south routes include East 185th Street (aka "Old World Plaza"), East 200, East 222, Babbitt Road, East 260th/Richmond Road (SR 175), Highland Road, and Lloyd Road.
 GCRTA bus routes serving Euclid include the #39 (Lakeshore), #10 (E. 105 / Lakeshore), #31 (St. Clair / Babbitt), #28/28A (Euclid Avenue), #37 (Hayden / E. 185), #34 (E. 200 / Green), and #94 (E. 260/Richmond). Several of these routes were originally operated by the now-defunct Euclid Transit System, whose operations merged with the GCRTA during the late 1970s.

Ethnic groups

Euclid is home to a variety of ethnic groups.  One of the largest is the city's historic Slovene population. There are a number of streets in Euclid that commemorate the Slovenian influence on Euclid, including Recher, Mavec, Drenik, Grdina, Trebec, Mozina, Kapel, and Ljubljana. Today, Euclid's largest ethnic population is African American, while also containing  sizeable populations of  Croats, Irish and Italian communities.

Education

Euclid City Schools is the local school district. Euclid High School is the local public high school.

Our Lady of the Lake, a Roman Catholic elementary school and church, is located on Lakeshore Boulevard.

Saints Robert and William Catholic School, also a Roman Catholic elementary school and church, is located on East 260th Street.

Notable people 
 Mike Adamle, born in Euclid; television personality and former National Football League player, co-host of American Gladiators
 Jacob M. Appel, author, wrote "Paracosmos" while living in Euclid
 Jessica Beard, born in Euclid; sprinter, gold medalist in world championships
 Charles F. Brush, born in Euclid; engineer, inventor, entrepreneur, and philanthropist.
 Laura Bell Bundy, actress and singer who has performed in a number of Broadway roles, both starring and supporting, as well as in television and film
 Philander Chase, founder of Kenyon College Bishop of Ohio and Illinois, Sixth Presiding Bishop of the National Episcopal church
 Richard Cowan, opera singer
 Mary Jo Kilroy, former congresswoman, born in Euclid 
 Rayshaun Kizer, football player
 Marie McMillin, World Record Parachutist and former WAC Rigger, died in Euclid in 1954
 Nathan Meeker, journalist
 Stipe Miocic, mixed martial artist in the Ultimate Fighting Championship (UFC); four-time UFC heavyweight champion
Laura Owens, artist
 Monica Potter, actress, known for films; appeared in NBC series Parenthood, for which she was nominated for a Golden Globe Award
 Hollis Resnik, actress known for Backdraft (1991), The Settlers III (1998) and Little Big Top (2006)
 Delvon Roe, actor, played Isaac in Love and Honor, sold at 2012 Cannes Film Festival; retired basketball player who played at Michigan State University
 Eric Singer, hard rock and heavy metal drummer for the rock band Kiss and formerly for singer Alice Cooper
 Robert Smith, football player and television commentator
 Amy Stoch, actress and academic, reached semifinals of spokesmodel category on television's Star Search 
 Jerry Tarkanian, known as "Tark the Shark," among most successful coaches in college basketball history, coached UNLV to 1990 NCAA championship
 Brett Tomko, Major League Baseball player, pitcher with 100 career victories
 Sunita Williams, American astronaut (with Slovenian and Indian roots), formerly held the record for longest single space flight by a woman (195 days)
 Roger Zelazny, author
 Jerome Zerbe, stunt photographer, born in Euclid

See also

 Euclid City School District
 Euclid Square Mall
 Euclid Trucks

References

External links

 City of Euclid official website
 Euclid Chamber of Commerce

 
Cities in Ohio
Cities in Cuyahoga County, Ohio
Ohio populated places on Lake Erie
Populated places established in 1796
Slovene-American culture in Ohio
Cleveland metropolitan area
1796 establishments in the Northwest Territory